William Chamberlain Duncan (May 18, 1820 – December 19, 1877) was a brewer, politician, and mayor of Detroit, Michigan.

Life and politics
Duncan was born in Lyons, New York on May 18, 1820.  The family moved to Rochester, New York in 1825, and in 1841 Duncan began working as a steward on the passenger steamers crossing the Great Lakes.  In 1846, he changed employers and began working on a steamer traveling through Lake Superior.  In 1849, Duncan moved to Detroit and became a brewer.

Duncan was a Democrat, and in 1852, he was elected an alderman, serving five years.  He was first council president, after a revision of the city charter created that position.  He was mayor of Detroit for two years, 1862 and 1863, and in the fall of 1863 was elected to the Michigan State Senate.  He began in the banking business in 1865, but soon gave up the trade due to impaired health and to take care of the property he had accumulated and to visit Europe.

In 1873, however, Duncan was chosen as a member of the newly created Board of Estimates.  In the same year, the city Democratic Party asked him to again be their candidate for mayor, but Duncan declined due to his ill-health.

William C. Duncan married Emma J. Hammer who died in 1863. They had a son, Frank C. Duncan, and a daughter, Kate Mary Emma Duncan. After the death of his wife, he married Sara Elizabeth Heath.

William C. Duncan  died on December 19, 1877.

References

1820 births
1877 deaths
Michigan state senators
Mayors of Detroit
People from Lyons, New York
Politicians from Rochester, New York
Detroit City Council members
19th-century American politicians